The canton of L'Estuaire is an administrative division of the Gironde department, southwestern France. It was created at the French canton reorganisation which came into effect in March 2015. Its seat is in Blaye.

It consists of the following communes:
 
Anglade
Bayon-sur-Gironde
Berson
Blaye
Bourg
Braud-et-Saint-Louis
Campugnan
Cars
Cartelègue
Comps
Étauliers
Eyrans
Fours
Gauriac
Lansac
Mazion
Mombrier
Plassac
Pleine-Selve
Prignac-et-Marcamps
Pugnac
Reignac
Saint-Androny
Saint-Aubin-de-Blaye
Saint-Ciers-de-Canesse
Saint-Ciers-sur-Gironde
Saint-Genès-de-Blaye
Saint-Martin-Lacaussade
Saint-Palais
Saint-Paul
Saint-Seurin-de-Bourg
Saint-Seurin-de-Cursac
Saint-Trojan
Samonac
Tauriac
Teuillac
Val-de-Livenne
Villeneuve

References

Cantons of Gironde